Erik Robert Parlevliet (8 June 1964 – 22 June 2007) was a Dutch field hockey player, who earned a total number of 155 caps, scoring 47 goals.

Life
Parlevliet was born in Zevenaar, Gelderland.  With Holland he won the Hockey World Cup in 1990. He was a member of the Dutch national team at the 1988 Summer Olympics in Seoul, South Korea, where the team won a bronze medal.

Parlevliet also played for the Dutch in five Champions Trophy competitions.

He died in Rosmalen, aged 43.

External links
  In Memoriam: Erik Parlevliet, Hockey Magazine
  KNHB Profile

External links
 

1964 births
2007 deaths
People from Zevenaar
Dutch male field hockey players
Field hockey players at the 1988 Summer Olympics
Olympic field hockey players of the Netherlands
Olympic bronze medalists for the Netherlands
Olympic medalists in field hockey
Medalists at the 1988 Summer Olympics
1990 Men's Hockey World Cup players
20th-century Dutch people
21st-century Dutch people
Sportspeople from Gelderland